Irantha is a small and little-known genus of assassin bug family (Reduviidae), in the subfamily Harpactorinae. Just four species have been described.

Species list
Irantha armipes (Stål, 1855)
Irantha bramarbas Breddin, 1903
Irantha consobrina Distant, 1904
Irantha nigrina Chen, Zhao & Cai, 2005

References

Reduviidae
Hemiptera of Asia